The Syria national football team represents Syria in international football and is controlled by the Syrian Arab Federation for Football, the governing body for football in Syria. Syria has never qualified for the World Cup finals but did reach the fourth qualification round in 2018. The team is currently banned by FIFA from playing at home, as they have not hosted a game since December 2010. Internationally, Syria won the 2012 WAFF Championship, 1957 Pan Arab Games and the 1987 Mediterranean Games.

History

From 1936 to 1969: The beginnings

The Syrian Football Federation was founded in 1936, 10 years before independence from the French in 1946. It has been affiliated with FIFA since 1937 and has been a member of AFC since 1969. Syria played its first unofficial matches under the name of Damascus XI with Lebanon (5–4) in 1939 and with Iraq (1–2) in 1944.

Syria played their first official game against Lebanon on 19 April 1942; Qasioun Eagles won 2–1. Syria's first official qualifying match was played in Ankara against Turkey, which ended in a Syrian defeat 7:0 on 20 November 1949. Thanks to that, the Syrian team participated in the 1950 World Cup European qualifiers as one of the first teams in the region to do so. One of the biggest defeats was played in Athens against the Greece, on 25 November 1949, 5 days after its first official match which ended in a score of 8:0 for the Greeks. 

At the 1951 Mediterranean Games in Alexandria, on 12 October 1951, one of Syria's biggest defeats was recorded against the Egypt which ended with a score of 8:0 for the Pharaohs.

The first great success of the national team was silver at the 1953 Pan Arab Games, when they were defeated in the final by Egypt (4:0). At the 1957 Pan Arab Games in Beirut, they advanced to the finals after the semi-final defeat of Morocco, in which they defeated Tunisia with goals scored by Shamas and Awadis Kaoulakian 3:1. 

In the FIFA World Cup 1958 qualifiers, the Syrian football team was defeated by the Sudan in the 1st round of the playoffs. Between 1958 and 1961, the team combined with Egypt to form the United Arab Republic national football team, although the team's records are attributed only to Egypt by FIFA.

They were twice a finalists in the Arab Cup: in 1963 (beaten by the Tunisia) and 1966 (beaten by Iraq).

In the 1966 World Cup qualifiers they were one of two teams from the Asian zone (the other being Israel) to be allocated to the European qualifying zone and were originally placed with Spain and the Republic of Ireland. However, they joined the Asian and African boycott of the 1966 qualifiers, due to the decision of FIFA to allocate just one place between Asia and Africa.

1970s: Successes in Arab competitions

In the 1970s, they regularly participated in the Palestine Cup, which served as a substitute for the Arab Cup. At the 1972 Palestine Cup, they placed fourth when they lost 1:3 to Algeria. At the 1973 Palestine Cup, they advanced from the group stage to the semifinals, where they eliminated Algeria after penalties (0:0, pen. 3:2). In the final of the cup, they clearly lost to Tunisia 0:4.

In the 1974 Kuneitra Cup, the Qasioun Eagles entered the knockout phase after the group defeat of Sudan, Libya, Palestine and North Yemen. In the semifinals of the cup, they defeated Tunisia (3:1), but in the final they unfortunately lost to Morocco after a penalty shootout.

For the 1974 World Cup, they finished second in the group in the 1st round of the qualification, behind the Iran, insufficient to advance to the next round. The players who made Syrian football famous were the players of Barada SC, with the best elite of football players, such as Faris Sultji, Marwan Dardari, Ahmad Talib Tamim, Mohammad Khair Dhaher, Ahmad Alian, Joseph Chahrestan, Farouq Bozo, Ahmad al-Akad, Jamal al-Sharif.

At the 1975 Palestine Cup, they eliminated Libya in the group stage, but lost to Iraq in the semifinals 0: 4 and in the bronze medal match with Sudan 0:1. In 1976, Damascus hosted the Pan Arab Games, whose football tournament was played at the Abbasiyyin Stadium, where the home Syrian team won bronze medals.

In the 1978 FIFA World Cup qualification, the Qasioun Eagles did not go through the first round, as despite losing one victory over Saudi Arabia (2:0) they lost both matches to Iran, finishing in third place in the group.

The years 1980-1996: an improvement in Syrian football 

The Syrian team made it to 1980 Olympics thanks to Iran, as the team withdrew due to the American-led boycott of the Olympics. Despite losing 0:3 to the Algeria and 0:5 to the GDR, they gained experience from big matches. However, the most valuable result in the tournament was a draw with a strong Spain 0:0.

The Syrian team took part in the three editions of the Asian Nations Cup in the 1980s. In 1980 Asian Cup, they finished 3rd out of 5 in the group stage, behind the North Korea and the Iran, ahead of the China and the Bangladesh. 

In 1984 Asian Nations Cup, they finished 4th out of 5 in the 1st round, ahead of the South Korea, behind Qatar, Kuwait and Saudi Arabia. In the 1988 Asian Nations Cup, they finished 3rd out of 5 still in the 1st round, behind the China and Saudi Arabia, ahead of Kuwait and Bahrain. The two Syrian scorers were with one goal each: Walid Nasser and Walid Al-Hel. They were a finalists in the Arab Nations Cup in 1988 (beaten by Iraq). During this period, Syria shows that it is very present on the Asian scene. 

For the qualifiers of the 1982 World Cup, they finished last in the group stage  behind the Qatar, Iraq, Saudi Arabia and Bahrain. As for the qualification round of the 1986 World Cup, Syria came very close to a qualification which would have been historic, since it passed the 1st round ahead of the Kuwait and the North Yemen, beat Bahrain and lost in the final qualifying round to Iraq 1:3 on aggregate, with the only Syrian goal scored by Walid Abu Al-Sel.

One of the greatest successes of the Qasioun Eagles in the 1980s was the participation in the finals of the 1987 Mediterranean Games, which took place in Latakia, and the defeat of the France team 2:1.

In the 1990 World Cup qualifiers, the national team placed second in the first round after losing to Saudi Arabia 4:5 (goal scorers: Mahrous, Jakalan, Al-Nasser and Helou).

In 1992, the Pan Arab Games were held in Syria, which included the Arab Cup In this tournament, the Syrian national team led by Virgil Dridea placed 4th after advancing to the semifinals (losing to Egypt 4:3 on penalties) and losing in the bronze medal match with Kuwait 1:2.

During the 1994 World Cup qualifiers, they led the qualifying group after winning over Taiwan and Oman, but due to draws with Iran (0:0 and 1:1, goal scored by Abdul Latif Helou), they did not advance to the second round.

In the 1st round of the 1996 Asian Cup, the Syrian team beat Uzbekistan (2:1), thanks to goals from Nader Joukhadar and Ali Dib, but they were beaten by Japan (1:2 , goal by Nader Joukhadar) and by China (0:3). By finishing 3rd in the group, they had a chance to qualify for the quarterfinals but having a low score compared to the other two countries (Iraq and South Korea), the team finished as the worst 3rd, again missed the knockout phase by a close margin.

From 1996 to 2007: Years of hope and disappointment

At the 1997 Pan Arab Games in Beirut, they reached the final, in which Jordan defeated them 0–1.

One of Syria's biggest victories was recorded in Tehran on 4 June 1997, against the Maldives, a match that ended by a final score of 12–0 for the Syrians. 5 days later it faces again the Maldives, still in Tehran, which ends with the same score of 12–0. These two matches were played  as a part of the qualification of the 1998 World Cup, where it was eliminated in the first preliminary round, ahead of the Iran.

The Syrian team was twice finalist in 2000 and in  2004 of a regional competition, the West Asian Football Championship, beaten each time by the Iran; as they reached the semi-finals of the West Asian Championship 2002 held at home but lost to the Jordan on a golden goal scored in the last minutes of extra time (1–2), before losing to Iran on penalties during the match for the 3rd place (2–2, 2–4). 

As for the qualification of the World Cup 2002, they were overtaken by the Oman at 1st, while being ahead of the Philippines and the Laos.

In the qualifiers for the 2006 World Cup, they did not advance to the third stage after uncertain match performances and losses with Bahrain (1–2) and Kyrgyzstan (0–1).

During this period, the national team participated in the 2007 Nehru Cup, where after the first victory over Bangladesh (2–0) they defeated Kyrgyzstan (4–1), India (3–2) and Cambodia (5–1) and advanced to the finals. The top scorers were famous Syrian stars Zyad Chaabo (5 goals) and Maher Al-Sayed (4 goals). But the cup final for the team did not turn out well, because they lost to India 0–1.

From 2007 to 2012: Great achievements

In 2007, Syria advanced to the WAAF Cup under the leadership of coach Fajr Ibrahim, where they after victories over Lebanon and Jordan (both 1–0), lost in the semifinals to Iraq 0–3.

A year later, the Qasioun Eagles took part in the 2008 WAAF Cup, where after a 2–1 victory over Oman and a draw with Jordan, they advanced to the semifinals, where they lost to Iran (0–2).

At the 2009 Nehru Cup, Syria sovereignly won the group stage, defeating Sri Lanka, Kyrgyzstan, Lebanon and, in a close match, India (1–0). In the final of the cup, they encountered India, with which they lost 1–2 on penalties (the only Syrian scorer was Ali Diab).

In the qualifications for the World Cup 2010, the team of Syria beat the Afghanistan in the 1st round, then the Indonesia in the 2nd round, but narrowly failed in the 3rd round to qualify for the 4th round, due to a unfavorable goal average, behind UAE and Iran, but ahead of Kuwait. 

The Syrian team qualified for the 2011 AFC Asian Cup in Qatar after a long absence from it since 1996, where it ascended to the championship without any loss in the qualifiers. They were eliminated from the group stage again after losing to Jordan and Japan and defeating Saudi Arabia. Shortly afterwards, they were disqualified from the 2014 World Cup due to the use of an ineligible player. 

In December 2012, Syria beat Iraq in the final of West Asia Cup to collect its first major trophy and Ahmad Al Saleh became the scorer of the historic winning goal (1–0). Official Syrian television interrupted its broadcasts to announce the victory and show the presentation of the cup live.

From 2013 to 2016: Withdrawal from positions

In 2013, the Syrian team withdrew from the WAAF Cup due to the war in the country. In the following years, the situation in the national team was not good because they could not play at home stadiums.

The Syrian national team missed the 2015 AFC Asian Cup after failing to qualify and occupying third place in the Group A that included Jordan, Singapore and Oman. In 2016, Syria took part in the King's Cup under national team captain Mosab Balhous and head coach Ayman Hakeem, where they lost in the semifinals after a penalty shootout with Thailand and defeated the United Arab Emirates 1–0 in third place match.

2018 World Cup qualifiers: Syria close to great success 

Ever since war broke out in the country, Syria have been banned from playing home games in their own country and in fact were one day away from being thrown out of the 2018 World Cup only for Malaysia to swoop in at the last minute and offer to host all of Syria's home games.

After finishing on second place in Group E during the 2018 World Cup 2nd qualifying round, behind Japan, but ahead of Singapore, Afghanistan and Cambodia. Syria was among the top 4 (2nd) and obtained the right to play in the 3rd round , in addition to being qualified for the next Asian Cup.

They were transferred to the group A, along with Iran, South Korea, Uzbekistan, China and Qatar. On 5 September 2017, Syria qualified for the first time in their history for the play-offs of a World Cup by finishing 3rd in their group with 13 points, level on points with Uzbekistan, but ahead in the standings thanks to better goal difference, following of their draw gleaned in stoppage time on the lawn of the Iran (2–2) in the last match. 

This was the best Qasioun Eagles  performance to date in a World Cup qualifying phase. The prospect of a historic qualification for a final phase of the World Cup has given rise to a momentary halt to the conflict which has ravaged the country for six years, as well as the installation of giant screens by the authorities in the main public squares of major cities to follow the decisive match against the Iran.

Syria v Australia 
On 5 October 2017 in Malacca, Syria managed to draw (1–1) against Australia thanks to a converted penalty in the 85 minute by Syrian best striker Omar Al Somah, who had already equalized in stoppage time in the last pool match against Iran, responding to the opening goal in the first half of Robbie Kruse.

In the return match played five days later in Sydney, the Syrians opened the scoring in the 6th minute of play, once again thanks to Al Somah, but Tim Cahill tied the two teams seven minutes after the opening goal. 

The two teams continued to neutralize each other and it was in extra time that the Australia took a decisive advantage in the 109th minute of play thanks to a new goal from Cahill, dashing Syria's last hopes of participating in a World Cup. Reduced to 10 at the start of extra time, Syria nevertheless bravely tried their luck, narrowly missing the equalizer and qualification for the intercontinental play-off during stoppage time in the 2nd half of extra time on a free kick from the essential Al Somah who found the post.

2019 Asian Cup: missed opportunity

At the 2019 AFC Asian Cup (Group B) in the United Arab Emirates, Syria under the leadership of then-head coach Bernd Strange, the national team drew 0–0 with Palestine in the first match of the tournament. Syria failed to advance from the group stage after losing to Australia (2–3) and Jordan (0–2). 

The Syrian coach Bernd Stange was sacked after this tournament, and replaced with former manager Fajr Ibrahim. The team's game didn't improve much after this intervention, and a new head coach Nabil Maâloul, had to come to improve the situation around the national team.

From 2019 to the present
In qualifying for the 2022 World Cup, which began in the fall of 2019, they were placed second in Group A of 2nd round after the draw. In the first matches of the group, the Qasioun Eagles comfortably won first over the Philippines (5–2), Maldives (2–1) and Guam (4–0). Subsequently, in an important match, they defeated China 2–1 after Osama Omari's goal and Zhang Linpeng's own goal. In the next match, the national team defeated the Philippines 1–0 with a decisive goal by midfielder Ward Al Salama. On 11 March 2020, Tunisian Nabil Maâloul was appointed head coach of Syria.

The last matches in the group were played in 2021 due to COVID-19 in Asia, when they first defeated the Maldives (4–0) and Guam (3–0), and then lost to China 1–3. In Group A, they took a perfect 1st place, and advanced to the 2023 AFC Asian Cup and also to the third stage of qualifying for the 2022 World Cup. 

Nabil Maâloul resigned on June 15, 2021 due to disagreements with the leadership of the football federation. Nizar Mahrous replaced him for the next qualification phase. The team started this part of the qualification with unconvincing results with Iran (0–1), UAE (1–1) and South Korea (1–2), with both Syrian goals scored by Omar Khribin and Mahmoud Al Baher. After a humiliating defeat in the Levantine derby with Lebanon (2–3, the scorers were Khrbin and Somah), a draw with Iraq (1–1 only goal was scored by Somah) and a high defeat with Iran (0–3), the head coach Mahrous was fired.

At 2021 FIFA Arab Cup, under the leadership of new coach Valeriu Tița, they showed up in good form. They played the first match in Group B against the UAE, which they lost 1–2. In the next match, Syria played well despite the previous results, as Oliver Kass Kawo and Mouhamad Anez scored 2–0 over the big favorite from Tunisia. In their last group match, the Qasioun Eagles lost very badly to Mauritania 1–2 when the equalizing goal was scored by Mahmoud Al Baher in the 52nd minute. They took 3rd place in the group and 9th place in overall.

In the last qualifying matches, they lost first to the UAE 0–2 then to South Korea with the same score, and due to these results Tița was dismissed. Ghassan Maatouk was appointed as the new national head coach on February 9, 2022, leading the team to victory in the derby with Lebanon (3–0) and a draw with Iraq (1–1) in the last two matches. As a result, the Syrian team finished 5th in Group A.

Stadiums

Team image

Rivalries
 

Syria's common rivals are mostly from the Levant and the Gulf, notably are Lebanon, Jordan, Palestine, Iraq and Iran.

Syria vs. Lebanon

Due to historical reasons, matches against Lebanon have been frequently followed and seen by Syrians as the most important rival. Syria played until today 25 games against Lebanon. The first match took place on 19 April 1942 in a friendly match against the  Cedars in Beirut, when Lebanon and Syria were a French colonies. In 1947 Syria played two more friendlies against Lebanon: 4–1 victory in Beirut on 4 May, and 1–0 victory in Aleppo on 18 May. It was at this time that the matches were the most regular. Syria dominates the series with 15 wins, 5 draws and 5 losses.

Syria vs. Jordan

Syria played their first official match against Jordan on 1 August 1953 in Alexandria, Egypt as part of the 1953 Pan Arab Games, winning 3–1. In later years, the derby gained mutual popularity mainly due to historical and political reasons, as Syrians consider Jordan as part of the original territory of Bilad al-Sham.

Nickname
The Syrian national team is known by supporters and the media as Nosour Qasioun, meaning The Eagles of Qasioun in reference to the Mount Qasioun, which stretch over Damascus.

Kits 
The Syria national football team's home color is red and away is white. In 2021, new versions of the jerseys were designed, which changed the white color borders and edges to gold. The national flag of Syria was replaced by the new emblem of the SFA, which symbolizes the eagle of Qasioun.

Results and fixtures

The following is a list of match results in the last 12 months, as well as any future matches that have been scheduled.

2022

2023

Coaching history

Current technical staff
As of 5 February 2023

Coaching history

Players

Current squad
The following players were called up for the friendly matches against Thailand and Bahrain on 25 and 28 March 2023. 

Information correct as of 30 December 2022, after the match against Oman.

Recent call-ups
The following players have also been called up to the Syria squad within the last 12 months.

SUS Player suspended.
INJ Player withdrew from the squad due to an injury.
RET Retired from the national team.
WD Player withdrew from the squad for non-injury related reasons.

Previous squads
Asian Cup
 1980 Asian Cup squad
 1984 Asian Cup squad
 1988 Asian Cup squad
 1996 Asian Cup squad
 2011 Asian Cup squad
 2019 Asian Cup squad

Player records

Players in bold are still active with Syria.

Most capped players

Top goalscorers

Competitive record

FIFA World Cup

*Denotes draws include knockout matches decided via penalty shoot-out.

AFC Asian Cup

*Denotes draws include knockout matches decided via penalty shoot-out.

Olympic Games

*Denotes draws include knockout matches decided via penalty shoot-out.

WAFF Championship

*Denotes draws include knockout matches decided via penalty shoot-out.

FIFA Arab Cup 

*Denotes draws include knockout matches decided via penalty shoot-out.

Palestine Cup of Nations

Pan Arab Games 

*Denotes draws include knockout matches decided via penalty shoot-out.

Mediterranean Games

Asian Games

*Denotes draws include knockout matches decided via penalty shoot-out.

West Asian Games 

*Denotes draws include knockout matches decided via penalty shoot-out.

Head-to-head record

Honours
West Asian Football Federation Championship
Winners (1): 2012
Runners-up (2): 2000, 2004
Fourth place (1): 2002
Semi-finals (2): 2007, 2008
Arab Cup
Runners-up (3): 1963, 1966, 1988
Fourth place (1): 1992
 Palestine Cup of Nations
Runners-up (1): 1973 
Fourth place (2): 1972, 1975
Pan Arab Games
Winners (1): 1957
Runners-up (2): 1953, 1997
Third place (1): 1976
Fourth place (1): 1992*
Mediterranean Games
Winners (1): 1987
Third place (1): 1951
Fourth place (1): 1955
West Asian Games
Runners-up (2): 1997, 2005
Third place (1): 2002
Kuneitra Cup
 Runners-up (1): 1974
Friendship Tournament
Runners-up (1): 1998
International Friendship Championship
Runners-up (2): 2018, 2019
King's Cup
Third place (1): 2016
Nehru Cup
Runners-up (2): 2007, 2009
Intercontinental Cup
Third place (1): 2019
Note: * The 1992 edition organised as part of the Pan Arab Games, and also counted as Arab Cup.

See also 
Syria national under-23 football team
Syria national under-20 football team
Syria national under-17 football team
Syria national futsal team
Syria women's national football team
Syrian Football Association
Football in Syria
Sport in Syria

References

External links

 Syria national team on FIFA.com
  Official website of Syrian Arab Federation of Football
 Syria national team on Goalzz.com
  Syria national team on Super.ae
  Syria national team on Kooora.com

 
Asian national association football teams